is a 1988 Japanese adult animated cyberpunk action film directed by Katsuhiro Otomo, produced by Ryōhei Suzuki and Shunzō Katō, and written by Otomo and Izo Hashimoto, based on Otomo's 1982 manga of the same name. Set in a dystopian 2019, it tells the story of Shōtarō Kaneda, a leader of a biker gang whose childhood friend, Tetsuo Shima, acquires incredible telekinetic abilities after a motorcycle accident, eventually threatening an entire military complex amid chaos and rebellion in the sprawling futuristic metropolis of Neo-Tokyo.

While most of the character designs and settings were adapted from the manga, the plot differs considerably and does not include much of the last half of the manga, which continued publication for two years after the film's release. The soundtrack, which draws heavily from traditional Indonesian gamelan as well as Japanese noh music, was composed by Shōji Yamashiro and performed by Geinoh Yamashirogumi.

Akira was released in Japan on July 16, 1988, by Toho; it was released the following year in the United States by Streamline Pictures. It garnered an international cult following after various theatrical and VHS releases, eventually earning over $80million worldwide in home video sales. It is widely regarded by audiences and critics as one of the greatest films ever made, especially in the field of animation and in the action and science fiction genres. It is regarded as a landmark in Japanese animation, widely considered one of the most influential and iconic anime films ever made. It is also a pivotal film in the cyberpunk genre, particularly the Japanese cyberpunk subgenre, as well as adult animation. The film had a significant impact on popular culture worldwide, paving the way for the growth of anime and Japanese popular culture in the Western world as well as influencing numerous works in animation, comics, film, music, television and video games. An iconic motorcycle maneuver from the film, known as the "Akira slide", has been widely referenced and homaged in many works of animation, film and television.

Plot 

In 2019, following a world war triggered by the sudden destruction of Tokyo on July 16, 1988, Neo-Tokyo is plagued by corruption, anti-government protests, terrorism, and gang violence. During a violent rally, the hot-headed Shōtarō Kaneda leads his vigilante bōsōzoku gang, the Capsules, against the rival Clown gang. Kaneda's best friend, Tetsuo Shima, inadvertently crashes his motorcycle into Takashi, an esper who escaped from a government laboratory with the aid of a resistance organization. Assisted by fellow esper Masaru, Japan Self-Defense Forces Colonel Shikishima recaptures Takashi, has Tetsuo hospitalized, and arrests the Capsules. While being interrogated by the police, Kaneda meets Kei, an activist within the resistance movement, and tricks the authorities into releasing her with his gang.

At a secret government facility, Shikishima and his head of research, Doctor Ōnishi, discover that Tetsuo possesses powerful psychic abilities similar to Akira, the esper responsible for Tokyo's 1988 destruction. Esper Kiyoko forewarns Shikishima of Neo-Tokyo's impending destruction, but the city's parliament dismisses Shikishima's concerns, leading him to consider killing Tetsuo to prevent another cataclysm. Meanwhile, Tetsuo escapes from the hospital, steals Kaneda's motorcycle, and tries fleeing Neo-Tokyo with his girlfriend Kaori, but the Clowns ambush them. The Capsules rescue Tetsuo and Kaori, but Tetsuo suffers intense headaches and hallucinations and is re-hospitalized.

Overhearing their plan to rescue Tetsuo and the other espers, Kaneda joins Kei's resistance cell. At the hospital, the espers try killing Tetsuo via hallucinations, but the attempt is thwarted. A frustrated Tetsuo searches for them, killing any orderlies and militiamen blocking his path. The resistance group infiltrates the hospital, and Kiyoko draws Kei and Kaneda into Shikishima and the espers' futile attempts to stop Tetsuo. Kiyoko tells Tetsuo that Akira, located in cryonic storage beneath the Olympic Stadium's construction site, could help Tetsuo with his powers. After rejecting everyone around him, especially Kaneda, Tetsuo flees the hospital to hunt for Akira.

Using Kei as a medium to stop Tetsuo, Kiyoko breaks her and Kaneda out of military custody. Shikishima stages a coup d'état against Neo-Tokyo's government and directs its military forces to destroy Tetsuo at any cost. At the Capsules' former hangout Harukiya Bar, Tetsuo confronts gangmates Yamagata and Kai over Kaneda's bike and kills Yamagata after his protest. Kai relays the news to Kaneda, who vows to avenge his friend, while Takashi brings Kei away. Mistaken for Akira by cultists, Tetsuo rampages through Neo-Tokyo, arriving at Akira's cryogenic storage dewar under the stadium. Kei fights Tetsuo, but he defeats her and exhumes Akira, only to find his remains sealed in jars for scientific research.

Kaneda fights Tetsuo with a laser rifle, and Shikishima fires an orbital weapon at him. While the latter destroys his arm, neither is able to stop him. Shikishima and Kaori approach the stadium, where Tetsuo, now with a robotic arm, is in great pain and losing control over his powers. Kaori tries restraining Tetsuo while Shikishima unsuccessfully offers to heal his injuries and help control his abilities. Kaneda again fights Tetsuo, who, weakened from the missing arm, mutates into a gigantic mass of flesh, engulfing Kaneda and killing Kaori. The espers revive Akira to stop the growing mass. Reuniting with his friends, Akira creates a singularity, drawing Tetsuo and Kaneda into another dimension. The espers teleport Shikishima to a safe distance as the singularity destroys Neo-Tokyo in a mirror of Tokyo's previous destruction, and they agree to rescue Kaneda, knowing they will not return to this dimension as a result.

In the singularity, Kaneda experiences Tetsuo and the espers' childhoods, including his and Tetsuo's friendship and the espers' psychic training before Tokyo's destruction. The espers return Kaneda to Neo-Tokyo, informing him that Akira will take Tetsuo to safety and that Kei is developing psychic powers. Ōnishi witnesses the birth of a universe but is killed in his lab's destruction. After consuming most of Neo-Tokyo, the singularity disappears, and water floods the crater left in its place. Mourning Tetsuo's loss, Kaneda discovers that Kei and Kai have survived, and they ride off into the ruins while Shikishima watches the sunrise. At an unspecified plane of reality, Tetsuo introduces himself and triggers the creation of a universe, finally transcending the limitations of human existence.

Voice cast

Production 
While working on the Akira manga, Katsuhiro Otomo did not intend to adapt the series; however, he became "very intrigued" when the offer to develop his work for the screen was put before him. He agreed to an anime film adaptation of the series on the grounds that he retained creative control of the project – this insistence was based on his experiences working on Harmagedon. The Akira Committee was the name given to a partnership of several major Japanese entertainment companies brought together to realize production of an Akira film. The group's assembly was necessitated by the unconventionally high budget of around ¥1,100,000,000, intended to achieve the desired epic standard equal to Otomo's over 2,000-page manga tale. The committee consisted of Kodansha, Mainichi Broadcasting System, Bandai, Hakuhodo, Toho, LaserDisc Corporation and Sumitomo Corporation who all forwarded money and promotion towards the film. The animation for the film was provided for by animation producers, Tokyo Movie Shinsha (now TMS Entertainment).

Akira had pre-scored dialogue (wherein the dialogue is recorded before the film starts production and the movements of the characters' lips are animated to match it; a first for an anime production and extremely unusual even today for an anime, although the voice actors did perform with the aid of animatics), and super-fluid motion as realized in the film's more than 160,000 animation cels. Computer-generated imagery was also used in the film (created by High-Tech Lab. Japan Inc. and the cooperative companies for computer graphics, Sumisho Electronic Systems, Inc. and Wavefront Technologies), primarily to animate the pattern indicator used by Doctor Ōnishi, but it was additionally used to plot the paths of falling objects, model parallax effects on backgrounds, and tweak lighting and lens flares. Unlike its live-action predecessors, Akira also had the budget to show a fully realized futuristic Tokyo.

This figure has caused some sources to claim it was the most expensive anime film at the time of release, however, this claim has been disputed by the film's producer Shigeru Watanabe.

The teaser trailer for Akira was released in 1987. The film's main production was completed in 1987, with sound recording and mixing performed in early 1988. It was released in 1988, two years before the manga officially ended in 1990. Otomo is claimed to have filled 2,000 pages of notebooks, containing various ideas and character designs for the film, but the final storyboard consisted of a trimmed-down 738 pages. He had great difficulty completing the manga; Otomo has stated that the inspiration for its conclusion arose from a conversation that he had with Alejandro Jodorowsky in 1990. He later recalled that the film project had to begin with the writing of an ending that would bring suitable closure to major characters, storylines, and themes without being extraordinarily lengthy, so that he could know in reverse order which manga elements would make the cut into the anime and thus suitably resolve the manga's various elements into a lean, two-hour story. Otomo has called making the film before finishing the manga "the worst possible idea". Although he came to like having two similar but different versions of the same story, he still felt too much of the original was cut out of the film.

Otomo is a big fan of Tetsujin 28-go. As a result, his naming conventions match the characters featured in Tetsujin 28-go: Kaneda shares his name with the protagonist of Tetsujin 28-go; Colonel Shikishima shares his name with Professor Shikishima of Tetsujin 28-go, while Tetsuo is named after Shikishima's son Tetsuo Shikishima; Akiras Ryūsaku is named after Ryūsaku Murasame. In addition, Takashi has a "26" tattooed on his hand which closely resembles the font used in Tetsujin 28-go. The namesake of the series, Akira, is the 28th in a line of psychics that the government has developed, the same number as Tetsujin-28.

One of the film's key animators was Makiko Futaki; she went on to become a lead animator for Studio Ghibli films such as Kiki's Delivery Service, Princess Mononoke (1997) and Howl's Moving Castle (2004), before passing away in 2016. Another key animator who worked on Akira was former  animator Yoshiji Kigami; he animated several entire scenes in Akira, such as the action scene in the sewers. He later joined Kyoto Animation.

Releases

Box office 

Akira was released by Toho on July 16, 1988. This made it a moderate success at the Japanese box office. The film's 4K remaster received a limited Japanese IMAX re-release in May 2020.

Fledgling North American distribution company Streamline Pictures soon acquired an existing English-language rendition created by Electric Media Inc. for Kodansha, which saw limited release in North American theaters on December 25, 1989. Streamline became the film's distributor, with Carl Macek leading the distribution.

In the United Kingdom, Akira was theatrically released by Island Visual Arts on January 25, 1991. It debuted at number three on the UK box office charts, grossing £439,345 in its opening weekend. It was fourth place the following week, was in the top ten for four weeks, and in the top 12 for seven weeks, grossing £878,695 by early March 1991. It was re-released on July 13, 2013, celebrating the 25th anniversary of the film, and again on September 21, 2016.

In Australia, Akira was theatrically released by Ronin Films. In Canada, the Streamline dub was released by Lionsgate (at the time known as C/FP Distribution), who would eventually become Manga Entertainment's owner through their media operating unit Starz Distribution, in 1990. In 2001, Pioneer released a new English dub which was produced by Animaze and ZRO Limit Productions and was presented in select theaters from March through December 2001. It was the 20th digital cinema release in North America (Star Wars: Episode I – The Phantom Menace was the first in 1999).

In Thailand, it was first released in 1990 under the Thai title อากีรา คนไม่ใช่คน ("Akira human nonhuman") with a Thai dubbed by Nontanund Entertainment, and was brought back to release only at Major Cineplex cinemas by Dream Express (DEX) in 2020.

In 2020, Manga Entertainment announced they would be releasing Akira in 4K and IMAX in the UK. The re-release in October 2020 debuted at number three on the UK box office charts, grossing £201,124 in its opening weekend. The restored 4K version was shown in North American movie theaters on September 24, 2020, and for multiple days in select IMAX auditoriums and other cinemas worldwide.

Home media 
VHS releases included the initial Streamline Video offering (May 1991), which received later wider distribution by Orion Home Video (September 1993). In the United Kingdom, Akira was released on video by Island World Communications in 1991. By 1993, the film had sold 60,000 tapes in the United Kingdom, 100,000 tapes in Europe, and 100,000 tapes in the United States.

The success of this release led to the creation of Manga Entertainment, who later took over the release. The original VHS release of Akira started up Manga Entertainment Australia and VHS distribution was handled by Ronin Films and PolyGram until 1994 when Siren Entertainment took over all of Manga Entertainment Australia's distribution including Akira under a special license from PolyGram, which handled Island's video distribution. Akira was re-released on video in 1994, and again on DVD in 2001 and distributed by Madman Entertainment and The AV Channel. Pioneer Entertainment issued a DVD and a VHS with a new English dub (the dub produced by Animaze) in 2001. This was one of the few releases from Pioneer to feature THX-certified audio and video. In 2002, Manga released a two-disc DVD featuring the new Pioneer/Animaze English dub followed in 2004 by another two-disc set containing the original Japanese as well as both the Streamline and Pioneer/Animaze dubs. This version did not contain standard English subtitles, only closed captioning subtitles. In 2005, Manga Entertainment and Boulevard UMD released Akira on UMD for the PlayStation Portable in the United Kingdom using the original Streamline dub.

In 1992, video-distribution company the Criterion Collection, which specializes in licensing "important classic and contemporary films", released a LaserDisc edition of Akira. The release is notable in that Akira is the first animated film to be released by Criterion and for more than twenty years their sole animated film to be released until their 2014 Blu-ray/DVD release of Fantastic Mr. Fox (2009).

A Blu-ray disc edition of the film was released on February 24, 2009, in North America by Bandai Entertainment under the Honneamise label. A Blu-ray edition of Akira was subsequently released in Australia by Madman Entertainment under exclusive license from Manga Entertainment UK and Kodansha. Madman has recently released a DVD/Blu-ray combo which license is separate from the standalone Blu-ray release because instead of the DVD version being the Manga Video UK version, it uses Madman/Manga's 2001 Special Edition DVD release which is licensed from Manga UK. The Blu-ray release is the first use the format's highest audio sampling rate (Dolby TrueHD 5.1 at 192 kHz for the Japanese audio track) and first to use the hypersonic effect (only available on the Japanese track and on high-end audio systems). Beyond Japanese with English subtitles, the Blu-ray also features the 2001 Pioneer/Animaze English dub (TrueHD 5.1 at 48 kHz). The DVD version was again released in 2012 by Bandai Entertainment. The film was licensed again by Funimation following Bandai Entertainment's closure shortly after its DVD release. The Funimation release includes both English dubs, Streamline in stereo and Pioneer in 5.1 surround (both TrueHD at 96 kHz). Funimation released a 25th anniversary Blu-ray/DVD combo and separate DVD release on November 12, 2013, which features the TrueHD Japanese audio and both English dubs (TrueHD at 96 kHz on Blu-ray). Best Buy released a limited edition exclusive Blu-ray Steelbook the same year.

On April 24, 2020, an Ultra HD Blu-ray version was released in Japan by Bandai Namco Entertainment, featuring a 4K HDR remaster sourced from the original 35mm film print, as well as the 192 kHz audio transfer created for prior Blu-ray releases. The same remaster was released by FUNimation on December 22, 2020.

, the film has earned over $80 million in worldwide home video sales. In the United States, it was the seventh best-selling DVD anime film of all time  and grossed $2,086,180 in Blu-ray sales . In the United Kingdom, it was 2020's ninth best-selling foreign language film on physical home video formats and the year's second best-selling Japanese film (below the anime Weathering with You).

Television 
The Streamline dub version first premiered on the Sci-Fi Channel in the 1990s during their week-long anime events and Saturday Anime block. The Pioneer dub of the film has aired twice on Adult Swim's Toonami programming block, once on December 7, 2013, with a rating of TV-MA-V, and again on December 20, 2014, both times with explicit language and nudity censored. It has aired numerous times on Australian FTA station SBS. In the United Kingdom, the film aired several times on BBC Two between 1994 and 1997.

Reception

Critical response 
On review aggregator Rotten Tomatoes the film has an approval score of 91% based on 53 reviews, with an average rating of 7.90/10. The site's critical consensus reads, "Akira is strikingly bloody and violent, but its phenomenal animation and sheer kinetic energy helped set the standard for modern anime."

From contemporary reviews, Tony Rayns commented in The Monthly Film Bulletin that the narrative was paced at such "speed and complexity" that "viewers who come to it without prior knowledge of the manga (comic-strip) version tend to find it almost overpowering" concluding that "The film virtually demands to be 'read' alongside the manga, and amounts to a kind of commentary on it." Discussing the story, Rayns found the film as "not particularly ground-breaking as science fiction" comparing the film to be between Blade Runner and 2001: A Space Odyssey with the films main achievement being "the sheer credibility of his vision of future-tech, as seen in fully thorough designs of vehicles, laboratory equipment" and that the film "yields some extremely arresting images in the film's closing scenes" and that "Simply as animation, Akira is an undoubted tour de force." Variety praises aspects of the film "from the imaginative and detailed design of tomorrow to the booming Dolby effects on the soundtrack" but criticizes the "slight stiffness in the drawing of human movement". Chicago Tribune's Dave Kehr commends Otomo's "excellent animation-specific ideas: Vehicles leave little color trails as they roar through the night, and there are a number of dream sequences that make nice use of the medium's ability to confound scale and distort perspective".

From retrospective reviews, Anime News Network's Bamboo Dong commends the Limited Edition's DVD for its "superbly translated" English subtitles and the commendable English dubbing, which "sticks very close to the English translation, and the voice actors deliver their lines with emotion". THEM Anime's Raphael See applauds the film's "astounding special effects and clean, crisp animation". Chris Beveridge comments on the Japanese audio, which brings "the forward soundstage nicely into play when required. Dialogue is well placed, with several key moments of directionality used perfectly". Janet Maslin of The New York Times commends Otomo's artwork, stating "the drawings of Neo-Tokyo by night are so intricately detailed that all the individual windows of huge skyscrapers appear distinct. And these night scenes glow with subtle, vibrant color". Richard Harrison of The Washington Post comments on the pace of the film, stating that the author "has condensed the narrative sprawl of the comics to provide coherence, though there's a bit of "Back to the Future Part II" incompleteness to the story. That hardly matters, since the film moves with such kinetic energy that you'll be hanging on for dear life". Roger Ebert compares the film to Mad Max, calling it "very gory, very gruesome, but entertaining in its own demented way." Kim Newman of Empire commends the film's "scintillating animated visuals, with not one – not one – computer-assisted shot in sight". Helen McCarthy in 500 Essential Anime Movies claims that the anime "remains fresh and exciting, easily holding its own against the products of two decades of massive technical advancement". Meanwhile, in February 2004, Dan Persons of Cinefantastique listed the film as one of the "10 Essential Animations", simply referring to the film as "the film that changed everything."

Awards 
In 1992, Akira won the Silver Scream Award at the Amsterdam Fantastic Film Festival.

Akira was one of the four nominees for the 2007 American Anime Awards' "Best Anime Feature" award, but it lost to Final Fantasy VII: Advent Children.

Johnny Yong Bosch, Kaneda's voice actor in the Pioneer English dub, was nominated for Best Actor and Best Actor in a Comedy at American Anime Awards, but lost to fellow Naruto and Persona  voice actors Vic Mignogna and Dave Wittenberg, respectively.

Music 

AKIRA: Original Soundtrack (Symphonic Suite AKIRA) was recorded by Geinoh Yamashirogumi (芸能山城組). The music was composed and conducted by musical director Shōji Yamashiro (pseudonym of Tsutomu Ōhashi), and performed by the collective Geinoh Yamashirogumi. The soundtrack draws heavily from traditional Indonesian gamelan music, in addition to elements of Japanese noh music.

It features music which was additionally re-recorded for release. "Kaneda", "Battle Against Clown" and "Exodus From the Underground Fortress" are really part of the same song cycle – elements of "Battle Against Clown" can be heard during the opening bike sequence, for example. The score is generally sequenced in the same order that the music occurs in the film. The North American version featured extensive production notes by David Keith Riddick and Robert Napton.

AKIRA: The Original Japanese Soundtrack; an alternate soundtrack was also released. This version included music as it appeared in the film with dialogue and sound-effects albeit ordered out of sequence.

The soundtrack spawned an album of electronica remixes from Bwana, called Capsules Pride. Samples from the Akira soundtrack have also been featured in numerous other hip hop and electronic music tracks.

Adaptations

Video games 
In 1988, Taito released an Akira adventure game for the Famicom exclusively in Japan. Another Akira game for the Atari Jaguar, Super NES, Genesis and Sega CD was being developed, but canceled along with prospects of another Akira title for the Game Boy and Game Gear handheld consoles. International Computer Entertainment produced a video game based on Akira for the Amiga and Amiga CD32 in 1994. To coincide with the DVD release in 2002, Bandai released Akira Psycho Ball, a pinball simulator for the PlayStation 2.

Live-action film 

Since 2002, Warner Bros. acquired the rights to create a live-action remake of Akira as a seven-figure deal. The live-action remake has undergone several failed attempts to produce it, with at least five different directors and ten different writers known to have been attached to it. By 2017, director Taika Waititi was named as the film's director for the live-action adaptation. Warner Bros. had scheduled the film for release on May 21, 2021, and filming was planned to start in California in July 2019. However, Warner Bros. put the work on indefinite hold just prior to filming as Waititi had chosen to first direct Thor: Love and Thunder, the sequel to Thor: Ragnarok, which he had also directed.

Legacy 

Akira is widely regarded as one of the greatest animated movies of all time and prompted an increase in popularity of anime movies in the US and, generally, outside Japan. It is still admired for its exceptional visuals. In Channel 4's 2005 poll of the 100 greatest animations of all time featuring both film and television, Akira came in at number 16. On Empire magazine's list of the 500 greatest movies of all time, Akira is number 440. It showed again on Empires list of The 100 Best Films Of World Cinema, coming in at No. 51. IGN also named it 14th on its list of Top 25 Animated Movies of All-Time. The Akira anime also made Time magazine's list of top 5 anime DVDs. The film also made number 16 on Time Outs top 50 animated movie list and number 5 on the Total Film Top 50 Animated Films list. The film was ranked No. 1 by Wizard's Anime magazine on their "Top 50 Anime released in North America" list in 2001. It was ranked No. 4 on The Hollywood Reporter critic's list of "10 Best Animated Films for Adults" in 2016. Roger Ebert of the Chicago Sun-Times selected Akira as his "Video Pick of the Week" in 1992 on Siskel & Ebert and the Movies. For its wider 2001 release, he gave the film "Thumbs Up".

Akira has also been regarded as one of the greatest action and science fiction films of all time. It was ranked number 22 on The Guardians list of best sci-fi and fantasy films, included on Film4's list of top 50 science fiction films, and ranked number 27 on Complex magazine's list of 50 best sci-fi movies. The Daily Telegraph listed Akira as the fifth greatest action film of all time. Phelim O'Neill of the Guardian draws a parallel on Akiras influence on the science-fiction genre to Blade Runner and Stanley Kubrick's 2001: A Space Odyssey. Akira is considered a landmark film in the cyberpunk genre, particularly the Japanese cyberpunk subgenre. The British Film Institute describes Akira as a vital cornerstone of the cyberpunk genre, along with Blade Runner and Neuromancer. Rob Garratt of South China Morning Post calls Akira one of "the most influential sci-fi visions ever realised" on film, comparable to the influence of Blade Runner. Akira is also credited as a breakthrough for adult animation, proving to global audiences that animation was not just for children.

Akira slide

The "Akira slide" refers to a scene where Kaneda slides into view with his motorbike, as he uses a sideways slide to bring his bike to a halt, while the bike gives off a trail of smoke and electric sparks caused by the slide. It is regarded as one of the most iconic anime scenes of all time, widely imitated and referenced in many works of animation, film and television. The Akira slide appears in many dozens of animated works, including Batman: The Animated Series (1993), You're Under Arrest (1994), Gargoyles (1994), Air Master (2003), Teenage Mutant Ninja Turtles (2003–2009), Yakitate Japan (2004), Super Robot Monkey Team Hyperforce Go (2005), Teen Titans (2005), Gurren Lagann (2007), Star Wars: Clone Wars (2003), Yu-Gi-Oh (2008–2016), Fresh Pretty Cure (2009), Lupin III vs. Detective Conan (2009), Pokémon: Diamond and Pearl (2009), Durarara (2010), Adventure Time (2011), Clarence (2014), Ready Player One (2018) and Marvel's Spider-Man (2018), among many others. Several live-action films have also paid homage to the Akira slide, notably in X-Men Origins: Wolverine (2009) and Nope (2022).

Cultural impact 
Akira is regarded by many critics as a landmark anime film, one that influenced much of the art in the anime world that followed its release with many illustrators in the manga industry citing the film as an important influence. Manga author Masashi Kishimoto, for example, recalls becoming fascinated with the way the poster was made and wished to imitate the series' creator Katsuhiro Otomo's style. The film had a significant impact on popular culture worldwide. The film led the way for the growth in popularity of anime outside Japan as well as Japanese popular culture in the Western world. Akira is considered a forerunner of the second wave of anime fandom that began in the early 1990s and has gained a massive cult following since then. It is credited with setting the scene for anime franchises such as Pokémon  and Naruto to become global cultural phenomena. According to The Guardian, the "cult 1988 anime taught western film-makers new ideas in storytelling, and helped cartoons grow up".Akira has influenced numerous works in animation, comics, film, music, television and video games. It inspired a wave of Japanese cyberpunk works, including manga and anime series such as Ghost in the Shell, Battle Angel Alita, Cowboy Bebop, Serial Experiments Lain, and Elfen Lied, live-action Japanese films such as Tetsuo: The Iron Man, and video games such as Hideo Kojima's Snatcher and Metal Gear Solid, and Squaresoft's Final Fantasy VII. Outside of Japan, Akira has been cited as a major influence on Hollywood films such as The Matrix, Dark City, Kill Bill, Chronicle, Looper, The Dark Knight, Midnight Special, Inception, Godzilla, Spider-Man: Into the Spider-Verse, and Puss in Boots: The Last Wish, television shows such as Batman Beyond and Stranger Things, and video games such as Core Design's Switchblade, Valve's Half-Life series, and Dontnod Entertainment's Remember Me. John Gaeta cited Akira as artistic inspiration for the bullet time effect in The Matrix films. Akira has also been credited with influencing the Star Wars franchise, including the prequel film trilogy and the Clone Wars film and television series. Todd McFarlane cited Akira as an influence on HBO animated television series Spawn.Akira has also influenced the work of musicians. The music video for the Michael Jackson and Janet Jackson song "Scream" (1995) features clips from Akira. Kanye West cited Akira as a major influence on his work, and he paid homage to the film in the "Stronger" (2007) music video. Lupe Fiasco's album Tetsuo & Youth (2015) is named after Tetsuo Shima. The popular bike from the film, Kaneda's Motorbike, appears in Steven Spielberg's film Ready Player One, and CD Projekt's video game Cyberpunk 2077. Deus Ex: Mankind Divided video game developer Eidos Montréal also paid homage to the film's poster. The season four premiere of Rick and Morty ("Edge of Tomorty: Rick Die Rickpeat") features a scene in which Morty, and then Rick, are transformed into a giant tendrilled monster that Jerry and Beth later refer to as "an Akira". The 2000 South Park episode Trapper Keeper has references to Akira, such as one of the characters transforming into a giant blob organism before absorbing several other characters, not unlike the movie. The stage name of pornographic actress Asa Akira also comes from Akira. The music video for Grimes' Delete Forever pays homage to Tetsuo's penultimate moments on the Olympic throne.

When Tokyo was chosen to host the 2020 Summer Olympics in the 2013 bidding process, several commentators claimed that Akira predicted the future event. In 2017, Akira was referenced in several Tokyo Olympic promotions. In February 2020, during the coronavirus pandemic and 147 days before the Olympics, a scene in Akira'' which calls for the cancellation of the 2020 Olympics (147 days before the event) led to a social media trend calling for the cancellation of the 2020 Olympics. The Summer Olympics were eventually postponed to 2021 due to the coronavirus pandemic.

References

Sources

External links 

  
 American site (archived by the Wayback Machine)
 
 
 
 
 

1980s dystopian films
1980s political films
1988 anime films
1988 directorial debut films
1988 films
1988 science fiction films
Adult animated science fiction films
Japanese animated horror films
Akira (franchise)
Animated cyberpunk films
Animated films set in the future
Animated films set in Tokyo
Animated post-apocalyptic films
Animated science fiction films
Anime films based on manga
Bandai Entertainment anime titles
Bandai Visual
Cyberpunk anime and manga
Films about telekinesis
Films about telepathy
Films about terrorism in Asia
Films about World War III
Films directed by Katsuhiro Otomo
Films set in 2019
Films set in Tokyo
Films set in the future
Funimation
Geneon USA
Japan Self-Defense Forces in fiction
Japanese adult animated films
Japanese animated science fiction films
Japanese science fiction action films
Japanese political films
Japanese post-apocalyptic films
1980s Japanese-language films
Manga Entertainment
Megacities in fiction
Metaphysical fiction films
Motorcycling films
TMS Entertainment
Teen fiction
Toho animated films
Toonami
Films about coups d'état